The F-Ups are an American punk rock band from Rochester, Minnesota. 
Founded in 1999, signed with Capitol Records in 2003, and reunited in 2020.
They are best known for their song 'Lazy Generation' which was featured on NHL 2005 and Burnout 3: Takedown, being the theme song for Takedown.
Several of the members formed a new band Hang 'Em High, which itself disbanded in 2014.

History
The group formed in 1999 while its members were still in high school. Originally the band was named Mr. Completely, and just prior to signing with Capitol Records in 2003 changed the name to "The F-Ups." They came second in a high school competition, but took first place the next year. They began touring locally before signing with Capitol Records in 2003. Their debut album, which featured a cover of Mott the Hoople's "All the Young Dudes", was released in July of the next year to mixed reviews.

The band drew lyrical influences from such experiences as laziness ("Lazy Generation", "I Don't Know"), rebellion against parents ("Look At Your Son Now", "Screw You") and even a Jerry Springer episode ("Crack Ho"). The group followed the album's release with appearances on the Warped Tour.

In late 2006, the group broke up, and Allen, DeWerd and Collett re-formed as Hang 'Em High (see below). Hang 'Em High disbanded in 2014.

In early 2015 Travis Allen and Taylor Nogo (Nogosek) formed a new band called The Shift with new members Cole Ebertowski (Guitar/Vocals)and Daniel Johnson (Bass). They are currently playing shows locally and plan to record a full-length album Starting in late October 2015.

The F-ups returned to music with all original members in 2020. They have an active YouTube channel and social media.

Album

Track listing
All lyrics written by The F-Ups.
All music written by Travis Allen, except on "All The Young Dudes", by Travis Allen and David Bowie.
Album title: The F-Ups
 "Lazy Generation" - 2:24
 "Screw You" - 2:34
 "Look At Your Son Now" - 2:44
 "Glad That I Lost You" - 2:27
 "I Don't Know" - 2:10
 "All the Young Dudes (Mott the Hoople cover)" - 3:06
 "Falling Down" - 3:35
 "Wrong The Right" - 2:24
 "Told You So" - 2:33
 "Eye For An Eye" - 2:12
 "Crack Ho" - 2:48
 "No No No" - 2:35

Credits
Travis Allen - lead vocals, lead guitar
Chris DeWerd - rhythm guitar, vocals
Andy Collett - bass guitar, backing vocals
Taylor Nogosek - drums

Members
Travis Allen - lead vocals, guitar
Taylor Nogo - drums, vocals
Andy Collett - bass guitar, vocals
Chris deWerd - guitar, vocals

Hang 'Em High

After The F-Ups break up in 2006, Travis Allen, Chris DeWerd and Andy Collett reformed with Bill Martin and Alex Allen (Travis' brother) as Hang 'Em High. Hang 'Em High released their debut album (called "Hang 'Em High") which is only available on Hang 'Em High's Myspace page. They performed at various venues and also an online venue called "Deep Rock Drive". Hang 'Em High released several YouTube videos under the name of "Doctornoise". Polls on their official website show that the fans' favourite song is "Old School Fight Song" and the fans' second favourite song is "Not For Me". Bill Martin left the band in 2009 to begin a solo project. The band has finished in May 2009.

Album

Track listing
All music and lyrics written by Hang 'Em High.

 "Overwhelming"
 "Last To Fall"
 "Just Back Down"
 "One World"
 "Cabin Fever"
 "I Wanna Know"
 "Full Throttle"
 "Not For Me"
 "Old School Fight Song"
 "It's Alright"
 "Goodbye For Now"
 "Sincity Murder"
 "Just The Way We Are"
 "Fade To Red"

Credits
Bill Martin - lead vocals
Travis Allen - lead guitar, vocals
Chris deWerd - rhythm guitar, vocals
Andy Collett - bass guitar
Alex Allen - drums

Album

Track listing
All music and lyrics written by Hang 'Em High.
 "Back in Session (Rock & Roll)"
 "Just Got Yourself to Blame"
 "One Night Stand"
 "Hitting the Bottle"
 "Wasting My Time" (On the CD e.p only)

The Shift

Album

Track listing
All music and lyrics written by The Shift.
 "Want You To Want"
 "Taking You Home"
 "Lay Down"
 "Dont Give Up"
 "This is it"  
 
Members 2015–present
Travis Allen - Guitar/ Lead Vocals
Cole Ebertowski - Guitar/ Vocals
Clay Ebertowski - Bass guitar/ Vocals
Taylor Nogosek - Drums
Alec Tackmann - Keyboards/ Percussion

Games
The song Lazy Generation was featured in NHL 2005 & Burnout 3: Takedown, with the song being the theme song of Takedown, but the line shit on a silver platter shines was changed to Gold on a silver platter shines.

References

External links
Facebook.com/fupsofficial
Instagram.com/fupsofficial

American pop punk groups
Punk rock groups from Minnesota
Musical groups established in 1999
Musical groups disestablished in 2006
Musical groups reestablished in 2009
Capitol Records artists
1999 establishments in Minnesota